Loop Creek may refer to:
Loop Creek (Idaho), a stream
Loop Creek (West Virginia), a stream